Orest Ivanovych Levytsky (– 9 May 1922) was a Ukrainian historian, ethnographer, and writer. He was a member of Kiev Hromada (Hromada), an editor of Kievan Past and a Russian language philologist.

Biography
Born near Poltava, in Mayachka village, into the family of a priest, Levytsky graduated the Poltava Divinity School and Seminary in 1869. In 1869-70 he worked as a private teacher in village Vepryk (near Hadiach). As the best student, Levytsky was referred to be studied at a theological academy, but unexpectedly enrolled into the Law faculty of Kiev University. Later he transferred to the History and Philology faculty, from which he graduated in 1874. Led by Volodymyr Antonovych, in 1874 Levytsky defended his dissertation "Overview of internal history of Little Russia in the second half of 17th century".

In 1874-1921 Levytsky was a secretary of the Provisional Commission in reviewing of old acts while teaching Russian language (1874-1909) in the Fourth Kiev Gymnasium and geography (1876-1877) in a music school. In 1879-87 he was a chief deputy of the Kiev Central Archive. He was one of founders of the National Academy of Sciences of Ukraine where he worked as a secretary in 1918-1920 and head of department on Social and Economical Sciences.

Awards
 Order of Saint Vladimir (1886)

Selected works
 Afanasiy Filippovich, Hegumen of Brest-Litovsk and his actions in protection of Orthodox Church against Unia Church (Афанасий Филиппович, игумен Брестлитовский, и его деятельность в защиту православия против унии, 1878)
 Socinianism in Poland and South-Western Russia in 16-17th centuries (Социнианство в Польше и Юго-Западной Руси в XVI и XVII веках, 1882)
 Anna-Aloise, the Princess of Ostroh (Анна-Алоиза, княжна Острожская, 1883)
 Internal affairs of Western Russian Church in the Polish-Lithuanian Commonwealth in the end of 16th century and the Union of Brest (Внутреннее состояние западно-русской церкви в Польско-Литовском государстве в конце XVI в. и уния (Из предисл. к 6 т. 1 ч. «Арх. Юго-зап. России»), 1884)
 Cyril Terlecki, episcope of Lutsk and Ostroh (Кирилл Терлецкий, епископ Луцкий и Острожский, 1885)
 Hypati Pociej, Metropolitan episcope of Kiev (Ипатий Потей, киевский униатский митрополит, 1885)
 Hanna Montowt. Historical outline of the life of Volhynian nobility in 16th century (Ганна Монтовт. Ист.-бытовой очерк из жизни волынского дворянства в XVI в., 1888)
 Outline of the old life of Volhynia and Ukraine. Issues 1-2 (Очерки старинного быта Волыни и Украины. Вып. 1-2, 1889—1891)
 Archaeological excursions of Taras Shevchenko in 1845-1856 (Археологические экскурсии Т. Г. Шевченко в 1845—1856 гг., 1894)

Bibliography
 Levytsky, O. About the courts of Cossack Hetmanate. "Rukh". Kharkiv. (translated by Mykola Horban)

External links
Orest Levytsky at the Institute of History of Ukraine website.
Orest Levytsky profile

1848 births
1922 deaths
People from Poltava Oblast
People from Poltava Governorate
20th-century Ukrainian historians
19th-century Ukrainian historians
Hromada (society) members
Taras Shevchenko National University of Kyiv, Historical faculty alumni
Presidents of the National Academy of Sciences of Ukraine
Recipients of the Order of St. Vladimir
Ukrainian male writers
19th-century male writers
20th-century male writers